Luigi Maria Viviani (? – 1856) was an Italian composer, conductor and violinist of Florentine origin. He was primarily noted for his ballet scores, most of them composed for the choreographers Giovanni Galzerani and Antonio Cortesi. His 1851 score for Fausto was particularly praised for its obbligato written for the bimbonclaro (a variation on the bass clarinet invented by the Florentine clarinetist and instrument-maker, Giovanni Bimboni).

Viviani also composed two operas: L'eroe francese, which premiered in 1826 at the Teatro Grande in Brescia, and L'amore in guerra, which premiered in 1829 at the Teatro Alfieri in Florence.

Ballet scores
Ero e Leandro, Giovanni Galzerani (choreographer), premiered Teatro Regio, Turin, 7 December 1823
La conquista del Perù, Giovanni Galzerani (choreographer), premiered Teatro Comunale, Bologna, 1 May 1824
L'eroe peruviano, Giovanni Galzerani (choreographer), premiered La Fenice, Venice, 26 December 1824
Virginia, Giovanni Galzerani (choreographer), premiered La Fenice, Venice, 8 February 1825
Oreste, Antonio Cortesi (choreographer), premiered  Teatro Regio, Turin, 26 December 1825
Chiara di Rosemberg, Antonio Cortesi (choreographer), premiered  Teatro Regio, Turin, 20 January 1826
Ines de Castro, Antonio Cortesi (choreographer), premiered  Teatro Regio, Turin, 20 March 1827
Merope, Antonio Cortesi (choreographer), premiered  Teatro Regio, Turin, 27 December 1828
L'ultimo giorno di Missolungi, Antonio Cortesi (choreographer),  premiered La Fenice, Venice, 16 February 1833
Le piccole Danaidi, Antonio Cortesi (choreographer), premiered  Teatro Regio, Turin, 6 January 1834
Gismonda (with Giovanni Bajetti),  Antonio Cortesi (choreographer), premiered La Fenice, Venice, 26 December 1835
Marco Visconti, Antonio Cortesi (choreographer), premiered La Scala, Milan, 19 October 1836
Il ratto delle donzelle veneziane, Antonio Cortesi (choreographer), premiered La Fenice, Venice, 26 December 1837
Polidoro re di Lesbo (with Andrea Galli), Emanuele Viotti (choreographer), premiered La Fenice, Venice, 2 March 1840
Mazeppa, Antonio Cortesi (choreographer), premiered Teatro Comunale, Bologna, 1 October 1844
Fausto, Antonio Cortesi (choreographer) based on Jules Perrot's choreography for Faust, premiered Teatro Regio, Turin, 25 December 1851
La Gerusalemme liberata, Antonio Cortesi (choreographer), premiered  Teatro Regio, Turin, 25 December 1852

References

External links
Scores by Luigi Maria Viviani at the International Music Score Library Project

Italian ballet composers
Italian opera composers
Male opera composers
19th-century classical composers
Musicians from Florence
1856 deaths
Year of birth missing
Italian male classical composers
Italian classical composers
19th-century Italian composers
19th-century Italian male musicians